Events from the year 1982 in Kuwait.

Incumbents
Emir: Jaber Al-Ahmad Al-Jaber Al-Sabah
Prime Minister: Saad Al-Salim Al-Sabah

Events
 Souk Al-Manakh stock market crash, late 1982

Births

 29 May – Saleh Al Sheikh
 28 September – Nawaf Al-Mutairi
 31 October – Ali Al Namash

References

 
Years of the 20th century in Kuwait
1980s in Kuwait